David L. Reich (born February 7, 1960) is an American academic anesthesiologist, who has been President & Chief Operating Officer of The Mount Sinai Hospital, and President of Mount Sinai Queens (both part of the Mount Sinai Health System in New York City), since October 2013.

Reich is the Horace W. Goldsmith Professor of Anesthesiology at the Mount Sinai Medical Center, and from 2004 to 2014 he served as the Chair of the Department of Anesthesiology. In 2011, he received the Physician of the Year Award from Mount Sinai's nurses and nursing leadership. In 2011–12, he served as President of The Mount Sinai Hospital Medical Board. In 2014, he received the Jacobi Medallion from the Mount Sinai Alumni Association.

Reich was among the first to demonstrate the utility of electronic medical records for large-scale retrospective investigations demonstrating the association of intraoperative hemodynamic abnormalities with adverse postoperative outcomes.

Reich has published over 35 book chapters, 30 invited articles or editorials, and over 130 peer-reviewed articles. He is associate editor of Kaplan’s Cardiac Anesthesia (Elsevier), which is in its seventh edition, and was formerly Editor-in-Chief of Seminars in Cardiothoracic and Vascular Anesthesia: The Journal of Perioperative Medicine.  Reich is editor of the text Monitoring in Anesthesia and Perioperative Care (Cambridge University Press) and co-editor of the text Perioperative Transesophageal Echocardiography: A Companion to Kaplan's Cardiac Anesthesia (Elsevier), which are in their first editions.

Biography

Early years and education
Reich was born and grew up in Philadelphia, Pennsylvania, where he attended Central High School ('77).  His parents, who live in Elkins Park, Pennsylvania, and were married for 60 years as of 2017, are Mary Lou Reich, a schoolteacher, and Pace Reich, an attorney who is a graduate of the University of Pennsylvania Law School and whose practice focuses on bankruptcy, corporate law, and commercial litigation. He has two siblings who are attorneys.

He graduated from Pennsylvania State University with a Bachelor of Science degree with highest distinction in 1980. Reich studied for two months as a medical student in 1980 in Jerusalem, Israel, at the Shaare Zedek Medical Center. He graduated from Jefferson Medical College (Five-Year Penn State-Jefferson Cooperative Program in Medicine) in 1982, becoming a doctor at 22 years of age. He completed two years of general surgery residency at Harbor–UCLA Medical Center in Torrance, California. He considered becoming a surgeon, but decided to focus on anesthesiology.

The Mount Sinai Hospital

Reich arrived at The Mount Sinai Hospital in 1984. There, he completed an anesthesiology residency and a fellowship in cardiothoracic anesthesia in 1987.

He was appointed co-director of Cardiothoracic Anesthesia in 1990. Reich was named Professor of Anesthesiology at Mount Sinai Medical Center in 2004, and is the Horace W. Goldsmith Professor of Anesthesiology. He served as the Chair of the Department of Anesthesiology at Mount Sinai Medical Center from 2004 to 2014. In 2011, he received the Physician of the Year Award from Mount Sinai's nurses and nursing leadership.  In 2011–12, he served as President of The Mount Sinai Hospital Medical Board. In 2014, he received the Jacobi Medallion from the Mount Sinai Alumni Association; it is the highest honor bestowed by the association.

Reich was named Interim President of The Mount Sinai Hospital in January 2013. In October of the same year he was named President & Chief Operating Officer of The Mount Sinai Hospital, and President of Mount Sinai Queens (both part of the Mount Sinai Health System).

Reich announced in March 2020 that the hospital was converting its lobbies into extra patient rooms to "meet the growing volume of patients" with coronavirus.

Research, academia, and publishing
Reich was among the first to demonstrate the utility of electronic medical records for large-scale retrospective investigations demonstrating the association of intraoperative hemodynamic abnormalities with adverse postoperative outcomes.

His areas of research interest in anesthesiology include medical informatics, cardiac anesthesia, hemodynamic monitoring, outcome effects of intraoperative hemodynamics, deep hypothermic circulatory arrest, neurocognitive outcome following thoracic aortic surgery, and practice management.

Reich is associate editor of Kaplan’s Cardiac Anesthesia (Elsevier), which is in its seventh edition, and was formerly Editor-in-Chief of Seminars in Cardiothoracic and Vascular Anesthesia: The Journal of Perioperative Medicine.  He is editor of the text Monitoring in Anesthesia and Perioperative Care (Cambridge University Press) and co-editor of the text Perioperative Transesophageal Echocardiography: A Companion to Kaplan's Cardiac Anesthesia (Elsevier), which are in their first editions.

Additional positions

U.S. Content Director for the International Organization for Terminology in Anesthesia (IOTA) of the Anesthesia Patient Safety Foundation. 
Former Co-Chair of Blood Filtration Committee, American Association of Medical Instrumentation
Member, Board of Directors, Society of Cardiovascular Anesthesiologists

Personal
Reich is Jewish. On November 24, 2002, The New York Times reported the commitment ceremony of Reich to Keith Loren Marran, stating that: "Keith Loren Marran Jr. and Dr. David Louis Reich are to celebrate their partnership today with a commitment ceremony at the Bloom Ballroom in Manhattan. Judge Paul G. Feinman of New York City Civil Court in Manhattan will officiate."

Writings
Reich has published over 35 book chapters, 30 invited articles or editorials, and over 130 peer-reviewed articles.

Partial list:

References

External links
The Mount Sinai Hospital homepage
Icahn School of Medicine at Mount Sinai homepage
Association for the Advancement of Medical Instrumentation
Society of Cardiovascular Anesthesiologists

1960 births
American medical academics
American anesthesiologists
Gay academics
Living people
Central High School (Philadelphia) alumni
Pennsylvania State University alumni
Jefferson Medical College alumni
Physicians from Philadelphia
20th-century American physicians
21st-century American physicians
21st-century LGBT people
Shaare Zedek Medical Center